Kow Ata (also The Bakharlyn) is an underground lake in an eponymous cave near Bäherden in Turkmenistan, at the foot of the Kopet Dag. It is the largest in Commonwealth of Independent States.

History 
The landform was first documented by archaeologists in 1856. Coverage by the local press in 1896—noting the authorities of Bäherden rail-station to have had a wooden staircase installed for safe descent—led to tourists from Ashgabat flocking the site.

In 1960s, a road was constructed to the cave, electricity supplied, and hotels built in nearby areas.

Geology

Cave 
The cave has a length of 250 m and variable width of 12–50 m. There are five entrances.

Lake 

The water flows out into a sulfur-rich spring.

Limnology 
The water has a high mineral content and is especially rich in sulfur. The water is transparent with a shade of bluish green.

Flora and fauna 
Bats, rodents, birds, and about 50 invertebrate species inhabit the cave.

Tourism 
Bathing is permitted in Kow Ata, making it a prominent weekend destination for residents of Ashgabat. A long-winding illuminated staircase leads to the cave. Changing cubicles and an observation platform are provided at about 80% length of the stair-route. There are no safety features except a tape warning swimmers to not proceed beyond.

Healing 
Balneotherapy is practiced.

Notes

References 

Underground lakes
Lakes of Turkmenistan